The cabinet headed by Mahmoud Ahmadinejad from 2005 to 2009 included the following members:

Cabinet 

|-
!colspan=7|
|-

References 

2005 establishments in Iran
2009 disestablishments in Iran
Iran
Iran
Ahmadinejad
Presidency of Mahmoud Ahmadinejad